The 188th Brigade was an infantry brigade of the British Army which comprised several battalions provided by the Royal Navy and Royal Marines.  The brigade was formed in July 1916 following the absorption of the Royal Naval Division into the British Army, thereby becoming the 63rd (Royal Naval) Division.  The brigade itself was the direct successor to the 1st (Royal Naval) Brigade, and would serve until its disbandment in 1919.

Formation 
In July 1916, the Royal Naval Division was placed under the control of the British Army, and subsequently left the jurisdiction of the Royal Navy.  On 19 July, the 188th Brigade was formed by redesignation of the 1st (Royal Naval) Brigade, which had been the new formation's direct predecessor.

Western Front

Battle of Ancre 

After the evacuation of Gallipoli, the Royal Naval Division moved to France where it participated as 63rd Division in the final phase of the Battle of the Somme, advancing along the River Ancre to capture Beaucourt. The division had four objectives during the Battle of Ancre, the Dotted Green Line, the German front trench, then the Green Line, the road to Beaucourt station. The road ran along a fortified ridge. The Yellow Line was a trench which lay beyond the road, around the remains of Beaucourt on its south-west edge and the final objective, the Red Line, was beyond Beaucourt, where the division was to consolidate.

The plan was for the battalions to leap-frog towards the final objective. The 1st Royal Marine Light Infantry (RMLI), Howe, Hawke and Hood battalions were assigned the Dotted Green Line and the Yellow Line, the 2nd RMLI, Anson, Nelson and Drake battalions were to take the Green and Red lines. When the battle began in the early hours of 13 November, platoons from the 1st RMLI crawled across no-man's land towards the German line. A creeping barrage was fired by the British artillery but many casualties were suffered in no-man's land, about 50 percent of the total casualties occurring before the first German trench had been captured. German artillery-fire and machine-gun fire was so effective that all company commanding officers of the 1st RMLI were killed before reaching the first objective.

The German trenches had been severely damaged by the British bombardment, the attackers lost direction and leap-frogging broke down. The commander and second-in-command of the Drake Battalion were killed and the Hawke battalion lost its commander and several company commanders. Freyberg, having been promoted to temporary lieutenant-colonel and command of the Hood Battalion, led it to the Green Line and pressed forward with the remaining men of the Drake Battalion. The station road served as a landmark and allowed the attackers to orientate themselves and re-organise the attack. The Nelson, Hawke and Howe battalions had suffered many casualties; Lieutenant-Colonel Burge of the Nelson Battalion was killed whilst attacking a fortified section of the Dotted Green Line and Lieutenant-Colonel Wilson was severely wounded attacking the same objective. Lieutenant-Colonel Saunders was killed early in the battle but the Anson Battalion still managed to capture the Green Line and advance to the Yellow Line, after making contact with the 51st Highland Division to its left. By  Beaucourt had been captured.

Actions of Miraumont 

On the north bank of the Ancre, the 63rd Division attacked on 17 February, with the 188th Brigade and two battalions of the 189th Brigade, to capture  of the road north from Baillescourt Farm towards Puisieux, to gain observation over Miraumont and form a defensive flank on the left, back to the existing front line. Two battalions attacked with a third battalion ready on the right flank, to reinforce them or to co-operate with the 18th Division between the Ancre and the Miraumont road. On the northern flank two infantry companies, engineers and pioneers were placed to establish the defensive flank on the left. The divisional artillery and an army field brigade with  guns and  provided covering fire, with three field batteries from the 62nd Division further north, to place a protective barrage along the northern flank. The darkness, fog and mud were as bad as on the south bank but the German defence was far less effective. The 63rd Division lost  and the three attacking divisions took

Second Battle of Passchendaele 

The division arrived at Ypres just before the Second Battle of Passchendaele (26 October – 10 November). On 26 October, Immediately to the north of the Canadian Corps, the supporting attack by XVIII Corps involved one brigade each from the 63rd and 58th divisions. The 188th Brigade, of the 63rd Division quickly captured Varlet Farm and Banff House. The centre of the attack was held up on the road between Bray Farm and the village of Wallemolen and the troops dug-in near Source Trench. As dark fell, Banff House was abandoned and the line reformed at Berks House, leaving Banff House and Source Trench the only part of the first objective not occupied. On 30 October, the 63rd Division infantry were caught by German artillery fire at their jumping-off line and made only slight progress in deep mud against German machine-gun fire. The infantry were unable to reach their rendezvous with the Canadians, leaving their troops at Source Farm and Vapour Farm in precarious positions. Two companies later advanced through the Canadian sector to capture Source Trench but were only able to reinforce the Canadian outpost at Source Farm, then form a defensive flank to Vapour Farm.

Disbandment 
Following the Armistice of 11 November 1918, the First World War came to an end, with the 63rd (Royal Naval) Division being in the area in Picardy.  In April 1919, the 188th Brigade, along with the remainder of the 63rd Division, was demobilised and its sub-units consequently disbanded, other than 1st Battalion, Royal Irish Regiment which was transferred to the British Army of the Rhine.

Commander 
Before the end of the Siege of Antwerp in 1914, Colonel David Mercer  took command of the 1st Royal Naval Brigade.  Before this appointment, he had been Assistant Adjutant General of the Royal Marines (since September 1911).  On 22 January 1914, Mercer was promoted as Temporary Major General.  He remained in command of the brigade, as Assistant Adjutant General until the brigade's disbandment in April 1919.  On 26 June 1916, Mercer was promoted to Adjutant General of the Royal Marines and subsequently promoted as a temporary Major General.

Uniform 
Although supporting troops of the Royal Naval Division were wearing the anchor divisional sign, in a variety of combinations of colours, it was not worn by the infantry.  They wore battle patches indicating the battalion, for example: Hawke, a black bird silhouette; Anson, a horizontal rectangle halved blue over light blue; Drake, a vertical rectangle halved blue (left) and light blue; Hood, a horizontal rectangle of light blue with a dark blue centre stripe; Royal Marines, a square of Corps ribbon; and Army units, either a title of a patch of regimental ribbon.

Below this patch was worn a square company patch: A Company was red, B Company was blue, C Company was yellow, and D Company was green.

Order of battle 
The order of battle of the brigade during the war was as follows:

 Brigade Headquarters
 2nd Battalion, The Royal Irish Regiment – joined on 23 April 1918
 1st Battalion, Royal Marines Light Infantry
 2nd Battalion, Royal Marines Light Infantry
 6th (Howe) Battalion – transferred from 2nd (Royal Naval) Brigade on 188th Brigade's formation
 8th (Anson) Battalion
 188th Machine Gun Company, Machine Gun Corps – joined 4 August 1916, transferred to Base Dépôt on 17 May 1916
 223rd Machine Gun Company, Machine Gun Corps – joined 12 June 1917, converged with other brigade companies to form 63rd Machine Gun Battalion on 1 March 1918
 188th Trench Mortar Battery, Royal Field Artillery – joined on 21 July 1916

Footnotes

Notes

Citations

References 

 
 
 
 
 
 
 

Military units and formations established in 1916
Military units and formations disestablished in 1919
Infantry brigades of the British Army in World War I
1916 establishments in the United Kingdom
1919 disestablishments in the United Kingdom
Royal Marines